Halasz or Halász is the Hungarian word for "fisher" as well as a Hungarian surname. Notable people with the surname include:

Bence Halász (born 1997), Hungarian athlete hammer thrower
Daniel Halasz II (born 1976), TV Executive living and working in Copenhagen, Denmark
Débora Halász, Brazilian classical pianist and harpsichordist
Gábor Halász (mathematician) (born 1941), Hungarian mathematician
Guyla Halasz (aka Brassaï) (1899–1984), Romanian photographer, sculptor, writer, and filmmaker
István Halász (born 1951), Hungarian football midfielder
János Halász or John Halas (1912–1995), Hungarian animator
János Halász (politician) (born 1963), Hungarian politician, member of the National Assembly
Károly Halász (born 1941), Hungarian sculptor, and painter
Lajos Halász, Hungarian jurist, Crown Prosecutor of Hungary in 1930
László Halász (disambiguation)
Máté Halász (born 1984), Hungarian handballer
Michael Halász (born 1938), Hungarian classical conductor
Péter Halász (actor) (1944–2006), Hungarian actor and director
Péter Halász (conductor) (born 1976), Hungarian conductor and pianist
Piri Halasz, American art critic and writer
Suzette Forgues Halasz (1918–2004), Canadian cellist and music educator

See also
Halasz Gambit, a chess opening that begins with the moves: 1. e4 e5 2. d4 exd4
Leslie Halasz Sabo or Leslie H. Sabo, Jr.
Halas (disambiguation)
Halászi

Hungarian-language surnames
Occupational surnames